This is a list of notable Ponceños, people from Ponce, Puerto Rico. Listed here are people who were either born in Ponce or who were not born in Ponce, but who are or were longtime residents of the city – the so-called adopted sons and daughters of Ponce, and known in Spanish as "Ponceñistas".  Ponce has also been the birthplace and the place of residence of many Puerto Ricans who became notable elsewhere. The following lists many of them as well. The list is arranged alphabetically by area of notability.

List of notable Ponceños by area of notability
The list is divided into categories and in some cases sub-categories which best describe the field for which the subject is most noted. For individuals notable in more than one field (such as "Luis A. Ferré" who is notable as a former "governor" and as an "industrialist") the entry is made under the field for which the individual is most noted.

: Top – Actors, actresses, comedians and directors, Architects, Authors, playwrights and poets, Beauty queens and fashion models, Business people and industrialists, Civil rights and/or political activists, Clergy, Composers, contemporary singers, musicians and opera, Criminals and outlaws, Diplomats, Educators, Governors, Historians, Journalists, Judges, law enforcement and firefighters, Military, Physicians, scientists and inventors, Politicians, Sportspeople, Visual Artists.

Actors, actresses, comedians, directors and entertainers
Marisol Calero, actressFilms: Under Suspicion, and "El último de los amantes" (the Spanish language version of The Last of the Red Hot Lovers).
Míriam Colón, actress Founder of New York City's Puerto Rican Traveling Theatre
María-Elena Laas, actressFilms: The Hot Chick, and Suffering Man's Charity, among others.
Walter Mercado, astrologer, dancer, telenovela actor, writer
Mario Montez, female impersonator/actorA Warhol superstar.
Tommy Muñiz, television producer comedian and actorPioneer in Puerto Rico television. Starred in the movie "Lo que le Pasó a Santiago", directed by Jacobo Morales, which was nominated for an Academy Award for Best Foreign Language Film.
Lymari Nadal, actress Film: American Gangster; TV: Battlestar Galactica
Elín Ortíz, actor, producer, comedian and screenwriter.For many years interpreted "Relíquia", mocking political corruption in Puerto Rico.
Jeimy Osorio, actress.Film: Una Maid en Manhattan, "Porque el amor manda", "Santa Diabla"; TV: Celia.
Gilluis Pérez, actor. TV: Nicky Jam: El Ganador.
Luis Raúl, actor, comedian and TV host Acted in many telenovelas. Hosted "Anda Pa'l Cara" and "Pa' Que Te Lo Goces"
Esther Sandoval, actress.Starred in "Ante La Ley", Puerto Rico's first telenovela.
Marta Romero, actress and singerOne of the pioneers of telenovelas in Puerto Rico 
Teófilo Torres, actor and film directorFilm: "Dios los cría", the Spanish language version of ...And God Created Them, among others.
Carmen Nydia Velázquez, comedian and singer Fictional role in the comedic duet "Susa y Epifanio"
Rosita Velázquez, actress, comedian and singer, grew up in Ponce.
Juan Emilio Viguié, film producerPioneer film producer. Made the first commercially successful films in the island, including "Romance Tropical", the first Puerto Rican film with sound.
Marco Zunino, actorStarred in the musicals  Jesucristo Superstar, Cabaret, Rent and Amor sin barreras (West Side Story).

Architects
Pedro Adolfo de Castro y Besosa, architectA graduate of an American architecture university, he designed masterpieces such as Castillo Serrallés and Casa de España.
Juan Bertoli Calderoni, architectDesigner of Teatro La Perla
Maruja Fuentes, industrial and environmental designer
Timoteo Luberza, architectDesigned Plaza del Mercado Isabel II
Andrés Mignucci, urbanist.Fellow of the American Institute of Architects. Winner of the Henry Klumb Award 2012.
Francisco Porrata-Doría, architectDesigned the Ponce Cathedral, Banco de Ponce building, and Banco Crédito y Ahorro Ponceño building.
Blas Silva, architectCreator of the Ponce Creole architectural style. Designed the Casa de la Masacre, Font-Ubides House, and the Subira House, among others.
Alfredo Wiechers Pieretti, architectDesigned many buildings now in the NRHP including Casa Wiechers-Villaronga, today the Museo de la Arquitectura Ponceña.

Authors, playwrights and poets
 César Andreu Iglesias, labor organizer, journalist, novelist, and short-story writer.Co-founder of Claridad. President of the Puerto Rican Communist Party, and recipient of the 1960 Award for Excellence in Journalism from the Puerto Rican Institute of Literature.
 Rosario Ferré, fiction writer, poet, essayist and biographerAward: Liberatur Prix Award, Frankfurt Book Fair.
Félix Franco-Oppenheimer, poet and writerHis works include "Contornos", "Imagen y visión edénica de Puerto Rico", and "Antología poética".
Pedro J. Labarthe, poet, journalist, essayist, and novelist.Documented the experience of Puerto Rican migration to New York. Major writings: The Son of Two Nations: The Private Life of a Columbia Student, among others.
Emilio J. Pasarell, short-story writer, novelist, and essayist. He was also an accomplished historian.Best known for his "Origenes y desarrollo de la aficcion teatral en Puerto Rico" (Origins and development of theater in Puerto Rico).
Pedro Pietri, poet, playwrightCo-founder of the Nuyorican Poets Café.
Magaly Quiñones, poet
Ed Vega, novelist and short-story writer. Major awards: PEN Oakland/Josephine Miles Literary Award (2004) and Washington Post Book of the Year Award (2004).
Iris Zavala, author, scholar, and poet. Major Awards: Medal of Honor, ICP; Gold Medal, AP; and Pen Club Award.

Beauty queens and fashion models
Denise Quiñones, beauty queenMiss Puerto Rico 2001, Miss Universe 2001
Maripily Rivera, model Model, TV host and actress

Business people and industrialists
Juan Bigas Moulins, businessmanPonce Servicios was named after him.
Salvador de Vives, Mayor of Ponce and founder of Hacienda Buena VistaUnder his mayoral administration, the Ponce City Hall was built.
Ramiro L. ColónFirst administrator of Cooperativa de Cafeteros de Puerto Rico, Café Rico.
Antonio Luis Ferré, businessman and industrialistOwner of Ferré-Rangel media emporium.
Luberza Oppenheimer, IsabelMadam of a notorious brothel.
Francisco Parra Duperón, lawyerFounder of Puerto Rico's oldest law firm in continuous operation, Parra, del Valle & Limeres.
José Miguel Rovira, industrialistFounder of Rovira Biscuits Corporation.
Ermelindo Salazar, businessmanFounded the Ponce Chamber of Commerce. Was also president of Banco Crédito y Ahorro Ponceño, one of the largest and oldest in the Island.
Félix Saurí Vivas, businessman and hacienda holderBuilt the third-oldest residence still standing in Ponce and which became Liceo Ponceño, Puerto Rico's first girls-only school, and later the Ponce Ramada Hotel.
Juan Serrallés, businessman and hacienda holderFounder of Destilería Serrallés and "Don Q".
Salvador Vassallo, industrialistFounder of Industrias Vassallo and subsidiaries.
Luis Fortuño Janeiro, journalist and member of the Puerto Rico SenateFounder of Ïmprenta Fortuño.

Civic leaders
Olimpio Otero Vergés, civic leader, merchant, attorneyInstrumental in the creation of the Parque de la Abolición, the building of road PR-123/PR-10, and the launching of 1883 Ponce Fair
Valentín Tricoche, philanthropist and civic leaderDonated the money for the construction of Acueducto de Ponce and what would become Hospital Tricoche.
Rafael Rivera Esbrí, civic leader and mayorA hero of 1898 "El Polvorín" fire.

Civil servants and public servants
Enrique Campos del Toro, businessman, banker, law professor and civil servantServed in several Commonwealth governmental positions, some of which were appointed by the president of the United States.
Carlos A. Chardón López, educator and civil servantChardón served twice as Puerto Rico's Secretary of Education
Carlos Fernando Chardón, Secretary of State and Adjuntant General of Puerto Rico.
Antonio S. Luchetti, engineer and public servantHeaded the launching of island-wide public electric service in Puerto Rico.
Mariano Villaronga-Toro, educator and public servantThe first Commissioner of Public Instruction after the creation of the Commonwealth of Puerto Rico. Displaced English as the language of instruction and replaced it with Spanish.

Civil rights and/or political activists
Carlos Alberto Torres, political activistNationalist and political prisoner.

Clergy
José Luis de Jesús, Creator of the "Creciendo en Gracia" sectSelf-proclaimed "Jesus Christ Man". Can be heard in 287 radio stations; founded a 24-hr TV network; has some 2 million followers in 35 countries.
Isolina Ferré, Catholic nunRecipient of the Presidential Medal of Freedom.
Félix Lázaro Martínez, bishop of PonceEducator at the Pontifical Catholic University of Puerto Rico
Juan Fremiot Torres Oliver, bishop of PonceLongest-serving bishop for the Roman Catholic Diocese of Ponce in Ponce, Puerto Rico, with 36 years of service.

Composers, contemporary singers, musicians and opera

Composers
Julio C. Arteaga, composer of danzas, musician and teacher.
Héctor Campos Parsi, composer and writerWrote many compositions, including the incidental music for both A Midsummer Night's Dream by Shakespeare, and Dracula by Bram Stoker.
Arístides Chavier Arévalo, pianist and composer.Chavier trained Luis A. Ferré as a concert-level pianist.
Juan Morel Campos, composer of danzas.Founder of the Ponce Municipal Band. Wrote over 550 compositions before he died on stage at age 39.
Juan Ríos Ovalle, composer of danzas, prolific musician and orchestra director.
Manuel G. Tavárez, composerKnown as "The father of the Puerto Rican danza"

Musicians
Carlos Alomar, guitarist, composer and arranger.Best known for his work with David Bowie, having played on more Bowie albums than any other musician.
Julio Alvarado Tricoche, musician, composer, band director.Best known for "Lejos de Ti".
Rubén Colón Tarrats, musician, composer, band director.
Domingo Cruz "Cocolía", musician and orchestra director.Director of the ultracentenarian Ponce Municipal Band.
Papo Lucca, multi-instrumentalist musician.Co-founder of La Sonora Ponceña, a salsa band. He also played the piano with The Fania All-Stars.
Elías López Sobá, classical music pianist and educator.Co-director of the annual Casals Festival since 2010.
Luis Osvaldo Pino Valdivieso, musician and band director.
Librado Net, musician, educator and painter.First director of the Escuela Libre de Música de Ponce and mastermind behind the creation of Puerto Rico's Free Music School system.
Elisa Tavárez, pianist

Contemporary singers
PJ Sin Suela, rapper, composer, and doctor. Pedro-Juan Vázquez Bragan better known as PJ Sin Suela has been known for his music career and his compromise with social matters in Puerto Rico.
Lorenzo S. Alvarado Santos, singer, composer, and guitarist.With Johnny Albino and Félix ("Ola") Martínez, made up Trío San Juan during the years 1949–1957. Among his best tunes was the 1956 bolero "Siete notas de amor".
Cheo Feliciano, salsa singer. Lead singer for the "Joe Cuba Sextet" and later with the Fania All-Stars.
Ruth Fernández, Contralto Bolero singer and singer of up tempo songs.Won numerous awards internationally during her lifetime. Was also elected to the Puerto Rico Senate.
Héctor Lavoe, Salsa and Bolero singer.Credited with starting the salsa movement in the early 1970s in collaboration with The Fania All-Stars.
"Lunna", Pop and Jazz singer.Director of the TV show "Objetivo Fama".
Ednita Nazario, Pop and rock singer.Has recorded over 50 albums, DVDs, and compilations.
Ismael Quintana, Salsa singer and composer.Recipient of the 1966 "Most Popular Latin Singer of the Year" award at the Palladium Ballroom. Also sang with The Fania All-Stars. 
Pete "El Conde" Rodríguez, Salsa singer. Sang with The Fania All-Stars and also had a solo career. 
Draco Rosa, Menudo musician and singer.Multiple-time Grammy and Latin Grammy winning musician, singer-songwriter, composer, multi-instrumentalist, record producer, poet and entrepreneur.
Carmín Vega, singer and comedian. Known as "The woman with a thousand voices and a thousand faces".
Juan Vélez, singer, musician and songwriter. Winner of the fourth season of Objetivo Fama.

Opera
Lizzie Graham, Soprano singerTrained 19th century international soprano singer Amalia Paoli.
Amalia Paoli, soprano opera singer.
Antonio Paoli, tenor opera singerFirst person in world history to record an entire opera
Melliangee Pérez, soprano opera singerRecipient of UNESCO's Soprano of the Year award.
 Graciela Rivera, soprano opera singerFirst Puerto Rican to sing a lead role at the Metropolitan Opera.

Theatrical arts
Luis Torres Nadal, playwright, poet, educator, actor, choreographer, and theatrical director.

Criminals and outlaws
Antonio Correa CottoNotorious 1930s outlaw.

Diplomats
Teodoro Moscoso, diplomat and civil servantFormer U.S. Ambassador to Venezuela and head of Alliance for Progress

Educators
Alfredo M. Aguayo, educator and writerEstablished the first laboratory of child psychology at the University of Havana
Carlos Albizu Miranda, psychologist and educatorFounder of Albizu University.
María Teresa Babín Cortés, educator, literary critic, and essayistAuthor of "Panorama de la Cultura Puertorriqueña", among others.
Hemeterio Colón Warens, educator, land surveyor, and mayor of CayeyFounded Colegio Central Ponceño in 1883. 
Jaime L. Drew, educator, civil servant, writer and engineerAuthor of "Libro de Poemas en Ingles y Espanol", among others.
Antonio García Padilla, scholar, and civil servantPresident of the University of Puerto Rico.
Manuel González Pató, educator, writer, and sportsman.Puerto Rico National Olympic team coach
Domingo Marrero Navarro, educator and writerAuthor of award-winning "El Centauro: Persona y Pensamiento de Ortega y Gasset" (Institute of Puerto Rican Culture)
Lolita Tizol, educatorTaught music for a meager $50 per month to an entire generation of Puerto Rican children.

Governors

Luis A. FerréAlso an industrialist and philanthropist. Founder of the Museo de Arte de Ponce and Ponce Cement, Inc.
Rafael Hernández ColónTwo-time governor of the Commonwealth of Puerto Rico, and, at 35, Puerto Rico's youngest governor ever.
Roberto Sánchez VilellaGovernor of the Commonwealth of Puerto Rico.

First Ladies of Puerto Rico
Conchita DapenaFirst Lady of Puerto Rico (1965–1966).
Rosario FerréFirst Lady of Puerto Rico (1970–1972).
Lila Mayoral WirshingYoungest First Lady of Puerto Rico (1973–1977, 1985–1992).
Lorenza Ramírez de ArellanoFirst Lady of Puerto Rico (1969–1970).

Historians
Silvia Álvarez Curbelo, architectural and cultural historianFounding member of the Puerto Rican Association of Historians, and director of the Center for Communications Research at the University of Puerto Rico.
 Francisco Lluch Mora, historian Wrote "Orígenes y Fundación de Ponce y Otras Noticias Relativas a su Desarrollo Urbano, Demográfico y Cultural (Siglos XVI-XIX)".
Ramón Marín, historianWrote the classical work: "Las fiestas populares de Ponce."
Antonio Mirabal, political historian and poetAuthor of "De Rosas a Trujillo: estudio histórico comparativo de las tiranías en América." Long-time chief archivist at Archivo Historico de Ponce 
Eduardo Neumann Gandía, historianAuthor of "Verdadera y Auténtica Historia de la Ciudad de Ponce."
Andrés Ramos Mattei, sugar industry historianSaid to be "the undisputed authority" on the subject of Puerto Rico's sugar industry.
Gladys Esther Tormes González, historianHead archivist and longest-serving archivist at the "Archivo Historico de Ponce".

Journalists
Carmen Dominicci, news anchor.
Juan González, journalistColumnist for New York's Daily News, and co-host the radio and television program Democracy Now!.
Washington Lloréns, journalist, writer, linguist, and scholar.
Jorge L. Ramos, news anchorEmmy Award-winning New York City television news anchor.
Ramón Enrique Torres, news anchor.

Judges, law enforcement and firefighters
Jeannette Ramos, Judge, Puerto Rico Court of AppealsPuerto Rico district judge and a First Lady of Puerto Rico (1967–1969).
Pedro Toledo, Puerto Rico Police CommissionerMain negotiator during the 1987 Atlanta Prison Riots. 
Raúl Gándara-Cartagena, Fire CommissionerThe first and longest-serving Fire Commissioner in Puerto Rico.

Military
Agüeybaná (Great Sun), Supreme Taíno chiefSupreme Cacique of Puerto Rico who welcomed Juan Ponce de León to the island.
Agüeybaná II, Supreme cacique of the entire island of "Borikén" Led the Taínos in the fight against Juan Ponce de León and the Spanish conquistadores in the Taíno rebellion of 1511.
Ramón Colón-López, chief master sergeant, U.S. Air ForceFirst and only Latino among the first six airmen to be awarded the Air Force Combat Action Medal.
Antonio J. Ramos, brigadier general, U.S. Air ForceFirst Latino to serve as commander, Air Force Security Assistance Center, Air Force Materiel Command.
 José Antonio Muñiz lieutenant colonel, U.S. Air ForceCo-founder of the Puerto Rico Air National Guard.
 Horacio Rivero, admiral, U.S. NavyFirst Puerto Rican and second Hispanic to become admiral (four-star) in the U.S. Navy. Commander of the American fleet that effected the blockade of the Soviet ships during the 1962 Cuban Missile Crisis.
 Eurípides Rubio, captain, U.S. ArmyPosthumously awarded the Medal of Honor for his actions at Tay Ninh Province in the Republic of Vietnam on 8 November 1966.
Raúl G. VillarongaFirst Puerto Rican to be elected mayor in the state of Texas. (Mayor of Killeen, Texas).
Luis R. Visot, major general, U. S. ArmyChief of Staff of the United States Army Reserve.

Physicians, scientists and inventors
Carlos E. Chardón Palacios, mycologistFather of Puerto Rican mycology and first Puerto Rican appointed as Chancellor of University of Puerto Rico.
Martín Corchado, physician and medical researcherWas also president of the Autonomist Party of Puerto Rico.
Manuel de la Pila Iglesias, physician and medical pioneerIntroduced the first EKG and X-ray machines to Puerto Rico. Considered to be "one of the giants of Puerto Rican medicine".
José N. Gándara, medical director at Hospital TricocheLead physician helping victims of the Ponce massacre, and witness at the trials of the accused Nacionalistas. Was Secretary of Health of Puerto Rico. Co-founder of the Popular Democratic Party of Puerto Rico.
Joxel García, Assistant Secretary for Health, First Puerto Rican to be appointed Assistant Secretary for Health, U.S. Department of Health and Human Services.
Julio J. Henna, physician and political activistCo-founder of New York City's French Hospital.
Gerónimo Lluberas, physician, writer, educator, medical missionaryOne of the first physicians in the United States and Puerto Rico to use the Prosorba column to treat rheumatoid arthritis.
Rafael López Nussa, physician and public servantPioneered heart surgeries in Puerto Rico.
Rafael Pujals, physician, civic leader and political activistFirst physician with a medical degree in the city and medical director at both Hospital de Damas and Hospital Tricoche.

Politicians
Pedro Albizu CamposPresident and principal leader of the Puerto Rican Nationalist Party.
Román Baldorioty de CastroConsidered "The Father of Puerto Rico's Autonomy".
Pedro ColónMember of the Wisconsin State Assembly.
Federico DegetauThe first Resident Commissioner to the United States.
Manuel V. Domenech Mayor of Ponce. Member of the Puerto Rico House of Representatives. Also an engineer and civil servant.
Maurice FerreFormer Mayor of Miami, Florida.
Marially González HuertasVice-president of the Senate of Puerto Rico.
María de Pérez AlmirotyFirst woman elected to the Senate of Puerto Rico
Ernesto Ramos Antonini Former Speaker of Puerto Rico's House of Representatives.
Luis Ernesto Ramos Yordán President of the Puerto Rico House of Representatives
Peter RiveraMember of the New York State Assembly.
Larry Seilhamer RodríguezSpeaker of the Senate of Puerto Rico. Also basketball player in BSN.
Rafael Cordero Santiago, long-serving mayor of Ponce; elected in 1989, and re-elected to three additional 4-year terms. Died in office.

Sportspeople

Baseball players and coachesRoberto AlomarFormer baseball player, MLB All-Star, third Puerto Rican inducted to the Baseball Hall of Fame (2011).Pedro Miguel CaratiniBaseball player.Orlando CepedaBaseball player and member of the Baseball Hall of Fame.Francisco "Pancho" CoímbreNegro league baseball All-Star player.Carlos CorreaMinnesota Twins player.Luis DeLeónFormer Major League Baseball pitcher for the San Diego Padres and the Seattle Mariners.Coco LaboyMLB player with San Francisco Giants, Montreal Expos and the St. Louis Cardinals.Ricky LedéeNine-year veteran in MLB playing as an outfielder.Javy LópezFormer catcher in Major League Baseball with the Atlanta Braves, the Baltimore Orioles and the Boston Red Sox.Felix MaldonadoMLB baseball manager.Pepe MangualMLB player with the Montreal Expos and New York Mets.Paquito MontanerFirst Puerto Rican baseball player to throw a "no-hitter" in Puerto Rican baseball.Millito NavarroFirst Puerto Rican to play in Negro leagues and the American Negro League's last surviving member.Luis QuiñonesFormer Major League Baseball player for the Oakland Athletics, San Francisco Giants, Chicago Cubs, Cincinnati Reds and the Minnesota Twins.Edwin RodriguezFormer Florida Marlins team manager.Benito SantiagoFormer 20-season catcher in Major League Baseball.Félix TorresMLB player with Los Angeles Angels, Cincinnati Redlegs and Philadelphia Phillies.Javier VázquezFormer MLB pitcher.Otto VélezMLB player with New York Yankees, Toronto Blue Jays, and Cleveland Indians.Enrique "Coco" Vicéns Basketball player with Leones de Ponce. Also a politician.

Basketball playersJuan "Pachín" VicénsBasketball player. Led the Lenoes de Ponce team to six championships.César BocachicaOlympic basketball player.Manolo CintrónFormer Puerto Rico Basketball league player. Also managed Puerto Rico National team to medals at multiple international games.Bobby Joe HattonPuerto Rico basketball league and Puerto Rico Olympic basketball team player.Miguel "Ali" BerdielPuerto Rico professional basketball league player and National Olympic team medalist.

BoxersJosé "Chegüi" TorresWBA light heavyweight champion and International Boxing Hall of Fame inductee.Carlos Ortíz Three-time world boxing champion.Alex SánchezLight flyweight boxer and WBO's world Strawweight championship.Mario Santiago2018 World Boxing Council Caribbean Featherweight champion in 2018.Juan CarazoTwo time world championship challenger, born in Ponce.

Other sportspeopleRicardo Busquets, Olympic swimmer.Javier Culson, track and field athleteOlympic medalist specializing in the 400-metre hurdles.Germán Figueroa, professional wrestler.Juan "Papo" Franceschi, track and field athleteGold medalist at Central American and Caribbean GamesEdgardo Guilbe, track and field athleteOlympic sprinter.Julio Enrique Monagas, sportsman, public servant and civic leader.Considered "The father of Olympic sports in Puerto Rico."Francisco Rosa Rivera, professional bodybuilder.Félix Serrallés, professional racing driver.Debora Seilhamer, Olympic volleyball player.Jesse Vassallo, swimmerFormer president (2004-2008), Puerto Rico Swimming Federation and member of the International Swimming Hall of Fame.Ivelisse Vélez, professional wrestlerLucha Underground.

Visual artistsAlbizu, Olga, abstract expressionist painter.Her works include album covers for Stan GetzEscobar, Elizam, painter and political activist.Dean of the Painting Department at the Escuela de Artes Plásticas de Puerto Rico, San Juan, Puerto Rico.Irizarry, Epifanio, painter and educator.His works include "Flamboyan" (1972).Penne, María Luisa, painter, educator, and graphic artist.Pou, Miguel, painter.Patrons include Museo de Arte de Ponce, Puerto Rico Museum of Contemporary Art and Puerto Rico Museum of Art.Rios Rey, Rafael, muralist.Patrons include Ponce YMCA Organization, Banco Crédito y Ahorro Ponceño, and Puerto Rico Iron Works.Torres Martinó, José A., painter.Co-founder of the Escuela de Artes Plásticas y Diseño de Puerto Rico.Quiñones, Lee, graffiti painter and actorPatrons include El Museo del Barrio, Whitney Museum of Art, Museum of the City of New York and the Groninger MuseumTorres, Wichie', Oil canvas painter.Exponent of the costumbrismo movement.

Table summary by year of birth
The following sortable table is a summary list of notable Ponceños and Ponceñistas arranged chronologically by year of birth.

See also
 List of Puerto Ricans
 List of tourist attractions in Ponce, Puerto Rico

Ponce
 
People